Family (also known as Family – Ties of Blood) is a 2006 Indian Hindi-language action thriller film directed by Rajkumar Santoshi. The film features Amitabh Bachchan, Akshay Kumar, Aryeman Ramsay and Bhumika Chawla in lead roles. It was released on January 13, 2006. It was Aryeman Ramsey's first main role in a film.

Plot 
Viren Sahai is an underworld don based out of Bangkok. Viren's spoilt brat Abhir is attacked by rival Khan, and Viren seeks revenge. He receives foolproof information that Khan and his nephew will be present at a local cinema theatre on a particular date, and he sets off to India to kill both of them.

The story then moves in the present onto the life of a simple canteen owner, Shekhar Bhatia, married to Dr. Kavita. Shekhar lives with his parents, his wife, and his younger brother Aryan. Aryan runs away one day from home, and Shekhar searches the whole city to find him. During his search, he witnesses Viren attacking Khan in the cinema theatre, causing a stampede and decides to help the innocent people in the cinema. Whilst helping the innocent, Shekhar finds Khan's nephew fatally wounded and tries to rescue him. Viren mistakenly shoots Shekhar instead of Khan's nephew, thinking Shekhar to be Khan's man. Soon enough, Viren brutally murders Khan's nephew and flees the theatre. Aryan returns home and learns that Shekhar was murdered when he was set out to search for him.

An enraged and shocked Aryan and his group of friends form a gang and kidnap Viren's entire family, including Abhir, with the idea of bringing Viren to them and seeking justice. Viren leaves no stone unturned to find out who dared do this. Each time he zeroes in on the gang, they manage to escape with the hostages. However, Abhir escapes and reaches his father. Aryan tries not to harm any of Viren's family members as he knows how precious a family is. However, Viren's wife suddenly dies when Abhir comes back to recover his family by himself with his gang, and accidentally shoots her while targeting Aryan. Viren believes Aryan is responsible for this. Aryan calls Viren to meet him at the same place where Viren killed Shekhar, along with the police. But the police decide to help Viren; thus, Aryan's plan fails. Aryan and his friends are taken into custody.

After constant pleading by his daughter and daughter in law, a changed Viren decides to end it all and surrenders to the police in condition that his son will be de-implicated in his crimes. After cremating his wife, he also tells them to release Aryan and his friends, but the latter are so enraged that they set out to kill Viren. Viren, in the meantime, is in for the shock of his life when corrupt cops come out with the intention of killing him in an encounter at the behest of his own son Abhir, who apparently has now teamed up with Khan. An intense gun battle ensues between Viren, Aryan, and the gangsters, where Viren kills the corrupt cops, Khan, Syed, and Babubhai. Abhir tries to shoot his father, but Viren ends up killing Abhir. Viren demands that Aryan kill him now, but Aryan tells him that Viren's punishment is not death. Rather it is life itself, as Viren has nothing left to live for. He simply throws his gun and walks away, with a now apparently insane Viren looking on and muttering. The film ends on a note of karma, and Aryan, with his friends, is now managing Shekhar's canteen.

Cast 
 Amitabh Bachchan as Ruthless Criminal Virendra "Viren" Sahai
 Akshay Kumar as Simple Cook Shekhar Bhatia 
 Bhumika Chawla as Dr. Kavita Bhatia
 Bhavna as Smita Badola
 Aryeman Ramsay as Aryan Bhatia, Shekhar's brother 
 Sunil Grover as Aryan's friend # 1
 Nawazuddin Siddiqui as Aryan's friend # 2
 Kamlesh Sawant 
 Aanjjan Srivastav as Kishore Bhatia, Shekhar and Aryan’s father 
 Bharati Achrekar as Vimla Bhatia, Shekhar and Aryan’s mother 
 Sushant Singh as Abhir Sahai, Viren's son
 Kader Khan as Kalim Khan
 Gulshan Grover as Babubhai Bichhoo 
 Raza Murad as Sehad Ali
 Shernaz Patel as Sharda Sahai, Viren's wife
 Viju Khote as Haider Chacha 
 Rujuta Deshmukh as Abhir's Wife

Soundtrack

The film's score and songs were composed by Ram Sampath, and the lyrics were penned by Sameer. The official soundtrack contains seven songs and two reprise versions. The song "Janam Janam", performed by Various Artists, was not used in the film.

Track listing

References

External links 

2006 films
2006 crime drama films
2000s vigilante films
2006 action thriller films
2000s crime action films
2000s crime drama films
Films directed by Rajkumar Santoshi
Indian action drama films
Films shot in the United Arab Emirates
2000s Hindi-language films
Films scored by Ram Sampath
Indian crime action films
Indian action thriller films
Indian vigilante films
Indian crime thriller films
Films about murder
Indian crime drama films
Indian thriller drama films
Gun fu films
Indian gangster films
Films about organised crime in India
Indian films about revenge
Films about families